is a paralympic athlete from Japan competing mainly in category F11 long jump and T11 sprint events.

Koichi competed in three Paralympics, his first in 1992 he won a bronze medal in the B3 long jump.  After missing the 1996 games he again competed in 2000 in the long jump and 100m but won a silver medal in the 4 × 100 m as part of the Japanese team.  He again missed a Paralympics before competing in the 2008 Summer Paralympics where despite competing in the 100m and long jump these were the first games that Koichi failed to win a medal.

References

Paralympic athletes of Japan
Athletes (track and field) at the 1992 Summer Paralympics
Athletes (track and field) at the 2000 Summer Paralympics
Athletes (track and field) at the 2008 Summer Paralympics
Paralympic silver medalists for Japan
Paralympic bronze medalists for Japan
Living people
Medalists at the 1992 Summer Paralympics
Medalists at the 2000 Summer Paralympics
Year of birth missing (living people)
Paralympic medalists in athletics (track and field)
Japanese male sprinters
Japanese male long jumpers
Visually impaired sprinters
Visually impaired long jumpers
Paralympic sprinters
Paralympic long jumpers